The Sanctuary of Santísimo Cristo de la Antigua y Virgen de la Encarnación (Spanish: Santuario del Santísimo Cristo de la Antigua y Virgen de la Encarnación) is a sanctuary located in Tobarra, Spain. It was declared Bien de Interés Cultural in 1981.

References 

Churches in Castilla–La Mancha
Bien de Interés Cultural landmarks in the Province of Albacete